Bernard Johnson Coliseum is a 6,110-seat multi-purpose arena on the campus of Sam Houston State University in Huntsville, Texas. It was built in 1976 and is home to the Sam Houston Bearkats men's and women's basketball teams, as well as the Bearkats women's volleyball team. It hosted the Southland Conference men's basketball tournament in 2003. It was also home to XWO Reborn, a professional wrestling organization that promoted shows throughout south Texas.

Sammypalooza & Kat Comedy Showcase
Since the fall of 2010, the Bernard G. Johnson Coliseum has been to the home of Sammypalooza, a free concert event for the SHSU community.

2010: Lifehouse, Jack Ingram, Story of the Year, Chalie Boy, VerseCity, Clairmont, Tim Qualls, The Adamant

2011: Taking Back Sunday, Vertical Horizon, Oh, Sleeper, Phil Pritchett, Vice Verse Us, The Last Great Assault

2012: Ludacris, The All-American Rejects, Eve 6

2014: Wiz Khalifa, Capital Cities

2015: Panic! At the Disco, Cassadee Pope, Mary Lambert

2016: T.I., Josh Turner

Starting in 2011, the Kat Comedy Showcase event was also added.

2011: Gabriel Iglesias

2013 (Spring): Mike Epps

2013 (Fall): Aziz Ansari, Nick Kroll

2014: Nick Swardson, Judah Friedlander

2015: Damon Wayans, Jay Pharoah, Damon Wayans, Jr.

See also
 List of NCAA Division I basketball arenas

References

External links
 

College basketball venues in the United States
Indoor arenas in Texas
Basketball venues in Texas
Sam Houston Bearkats basketball
Volleyball venues in Texas